Leon Stokesbury (1945 Oklahoma City- November 13, 2018) was an American poet.

Life
He graduated from the University of Arkansas with an MFA, and earned his Ph.D. at Florida State University. He taught creative writing at Georgia State University.

Awards
 1999 National Endowment for the Arts Grant
 1998 Poets' Prize
 1990 Robert Frost Fellowship in Poetry from the Breadloaf Writers Conference
 1992 Distinguished Georgia Poet of the Year Award
 1985 Porter Prize

Works
"Unsent Letter to My Brother in His Pain", Good Times Santa Cruz

Anthologies

Editor
 
 2nd edition.
The Light the Dead See: The Selected Poems of Frank Stanford. Ed. Leon Stokesbury. University of Arkansas Press  1991.

References

External links
"Dictionary of Literary Biography on Leon Stokesbury"

1945 births
2018 deaths
American male poets
University of Arkansas alumni
Florida State University alumni
Georgia State University faculty